John Taylor was the first British missionary to settle in South Africa. He was born in Perth, Scotland, in 1767 and went to South Africa in 1807. He left the Scottish Unionist Church and joined the Dutch Reformed Church after marrying the daughter of one of the Dutch settlers.

1767 births
People from Perth, Scotland
Scottish Protestant missionaries
Members of the Dutch Reformed Church in South Africa
Year of death missing
Scottish emigrants to South Africa
Protestant missionaries in South Africa